Argopsis is a genus of lichenized fungi in the class Lecanoromycetes. , it has not been assigned to a family or order.

References

External links
Argopsis at Index Fungorum

Teloschistales genera
Lichen genera
Taxa named by Theodor Magnus Fries